Manuel Carlos Piar Guayana International Airport  (Spanish: Aeropuerto Internacional de Guayana "Manuel Carlos Piar"), is an airport in the city of Ciudad Guayana, Venezuela.  Ciudad Guayana is divided into two main population centres, San Félix and Puerto Ordaz, where the airport is located and hence its IATA code of PZO. The city sits at the confluence of the Orinoco and Caroni Rivers, and is the main access point for the natural attractions in south-east Venezuela, mainly Canaima National Park and Gran Sabana.

The airport is named after Manuel Piar, victorious general at the Battle of San Félix in the Venezuelan War of Independence.

Most of its current facilities and lay-out comes from the large renovation done in 2007, in preparation for the 2007 Copa América held in Venezuela.

The Guayana VORTAC (Ident: GNA) is located on the field.

Airlines and destinations

See also
Transport in Venezuela
List of airports in Venezuela

References

External links
OurAirports - Guayana
OpenStreetMap - Guayana
CONVIASA service to Guayana

Airports in Venezuela
Buildings and structures in Bolívar (state)
Buildings and structures in Ciudad Guayana